Andrew M. Thurman (born December 10, 1991) is an American former professional baseball pitcher.

Career
Thurman attended Orange Lutheran High School in Orange, California, and played for the school's baseball team. He enrolled at the University of California, Irvine where he played college baseball for the UC Irvine Anteaters. In 2011 and 2012, he played collegiate summer baseball with the Yarmouth–Dennis Red Sox of the Cape Cod Baseball League. The Houston Astros selected Thurman in the second round, with the 40th overall selection, of the 2013 MLB Draft. Thurman signed with the Astros, receiving a $1.4 million signing bonus.

Thurman made his professional debut with the Tri-City ValleyCats of the Class A-Short Season New York–Penn League after he signed. In 2014, he played for the Quad Cities River Bandits of the Class A Midwest League.

The Astros traded Thurman, Mike Foltynewicz, and Rio Ruiz to the Atlanta Braves in exchange for Evan Gattis and James Hoyt on January 14, 2015. Thurman began the 2015 season with the Carolina Mudcats of the Class A-Advanced Carolina League, but went on the disabled list after the Mudcats' team bus flipped over on May 12. He missed two months of the season. Thurman began the 2016 season with the Mississippi Braves of the Class AA Southern League. He was demoted to Carolina on July 20, and released on August 18.

Thurman signed a minor league contract with the Los Angeles Dodgers in December 2016. He appeared in 17 games between Class-A Rancho Cucamonga and Double-A Tulsa and was 2–1 with a 1.91 ERA.

On April 19, 2018, Thurman signed with the Sioux City Explorers of the independent American Association. He was released prior to the season on May 15, 2018.

References

External links

1991 births
Living people
Sportspeople from Orange, California
Baseball players from California
Baseball pitchers
UC Irvine Anteaters baseball players
Yarmouth–Dennis Red Sox players
Tri-City ValleyCats players
Quad Cities River Bandits players
Gulf Coast Braves players
Carolina Mudcats players
Peoria Javelinas players
Mississippi Braves players
Rancho Cucamonga Quakes players
Tulsa Drillers players